A modular building is a prefabricated building that consists of repeated sections called modules. Modularity involves constructing sections away from the building site, then delivering them to the intended site. Installation of the prefabricated sections is completed on site. Prefabricated sections are sometimes placed using a crane. The modules can be placed side-by-side, end-to-end, or stacked, allowing for a variety of configurations and styles. After placement, the modules are joined together using inter-module connections, also known as inter-connections. The inter-connections tie the individual modules together to form the overall building structure.

Uses 

Modular buildings may be used for long-term, temporary or permanent facilities, such as construction camps, schools and classrooms, civilian and military housing, and industrial facilities. Modular buildings are used in remote and rural areas where conventional construction may not be reasonable or possible, for example, the Halley VI accommodation pods used for a BAS Antarctic expedition. Other uses have included churches, health care facilities, sales and retail offices, fast food restaurants and cruise ship construction. They can also be used in areas that have weather concerns, such as hurricanes. Modular buildings are often used to provide temporary facilities, including toilets and ablutions at events. The portability of the buildings makes them popular with hire companies and clients alike. The use of modular buildings enables events to be held at locations where existing facilities are unavailable, or unable to support the number of event attendees.

Construction process
Construction is offsite, using lean manufacturing techniques to prefabricate single or multi-story buildings in deliverable module sections. Often, modules are based around standard 20 foot containers, using the same dimensions, structures, building and stacking/placing techniques, but with smooth (instead of corrugated) walls, glossy white paint, and provisions for windows, power, potable water, sewage lines, telecommunications and air conditioning. Permanent Modular Construction (PMC) buildings are manufactured in a controlled setting and can be constructed of wood, steel, or concrete. Modular components are typically constructed indoors on assembly lines. Modules' construction may take as little as ten days but more often one to three months. PMC modules can be integrated into site built projects or stand alone and can be delivered with MEP, fixtures and interior finishes.

The buildings are 60% to 90% completed offsite in a factory-controlled environment, and transported and assembled at the final building site. This can comprise the entire building or be components or subassemblies of larger structures. In many cases, modular contractors work with traditional general contractors to exploit the resources and advantages of each type of construction. Completed modules are transported to the building site and assembled by a crane. Placement of the modules may take from several hours to several days.

Permanent modular buildings are built to meet or exceed the same building codes and standards as site-built structures and the same architect-specified materials used in conventionally constructed buildings are used in modular construction projects. PMC can have as many stories as building codes allow. Unlike relocatable buildings, PMC structures are intended to remain in one location for the duration of their useful life.

Manufacturing considerations
The entire process of modular construction places significance on the design stage. This is where practices such as Design for Manufacture and Assembly (DfMA) are used to ensure that assembly tolerances are controlled throughout manufacture and assembly on site. It is vital that there is enough allowance in the design to allow the assembly to take up any "slack" or misalignment of components. The use of advanced CAD systems, 3D printing and manufacturing control systems are important for modular construction to be successful. This is quite unlike on-site construction where the tradesman can often make the part to suit any particular installation.

Advantages

Modular buildings are argued to have advantages over conventional buildings, for a variety of reasons. 
Speed of construction/faster return on investment. Modular construction allows for the building and the site work to be completed simultaneously. According to some materials, this can reduce the overall completion schedule by as much as 50%. This also reduces labor, financing and supervision costs. To save even more time and money, nearly all design and engineering disciplines are part of the manufacturing process. Also unique to modular construction is the ability to simultaneously construct a building's floors, walls, ceilings, rafters, and roofs. During site-built construction, walls cannot be set until floors are in position, and ceilings and rafters cannot be added until walls are erected. On the other hand, with modular construction, walls, floors, ceilings, and rafters are all built at the same time, and then brought together in the same factory to form a building. This process can allow modular construction times of half that of conventional, stick-built construction.
Indoor construction. Assembly is independent of weather, which can increase work efficiency and avoids damaged building material.
Ability to service remote locations. Particularly in countries in which potential markets may be located far from industrial centers, such as Australia, there can be much higher costs to build a site-built house in a remote area or an area experiencing a construction boom such as mining towns. Modular buildings are also beneficial in providing medical and sanitary facilities where time, space, and money are an issue. 
Low waste. With the same plans being constantly built, the manufacturer has records of exactly what quantity of materials are needed for a given job. With the consistency, builders can design systems that use common lengths of lumber, wallboard, etc., cut items with maximum efficiency, or be able to order special lengths in bulk. While waste from a site-built dwelling may typically fill several large dumpsters, construction of a modular dwelling generates much less waste. According to the UK group WRAP, up to a 90% reduction in materials can be achieved through the use of modular construction. Materials minimized include: wood pallets, shrink wrap, cardboard, plasterboard, timber, concrete, bricks, and cement.
Environmentally friendly construction process. Modular construction reduces waste and site disturbance compared to site-built structures. The controlled environment of the factory allows for more accurate construction while allowing the extra materials to be recycled in-house. 
Flexibility. One can continually add to a modular building, including creating high rises. When the needs change, modular buildings can be disassembled and the modules relocated or refurbished for their next use reducing the demand for raw materials and minimizing the amount of energy expended to create a building to meet the new need. In essence, the entire building can be recycled in some cases.
Quality. Combining traditional building techniques, quality manufacturing and third-party agencies who offer random inspections, testing, and certification services for quality control, commercial modular buildings are built in strict accordance with appropriate local, state, and national regulations and codes. Due to the need to transport modules to the final site, each module must be built to independently withstand travel and installation requirements. Thus the final module-to-module assembly of independently durable components can yield a final product that is more durable than site-built structures. Modular buildings often use Structural Insulated Panels (SIPs) in construction, which offer a range of advantages over traditional building materials. SIPs panels are a light yet durable combination of panel board and either closed-cell polyurethane (PU) or expanded polystyrene (EPS) insulating foam. They are air-tight, and as such provide excellent thermal performance. They also offer superior damp and cold resistance when compared to timber and other materials, and are immune to both compression shrinking and cold bridging. Modular units may also be designed to fit in with external aesthetics of any existing building and modular units once assembled can be virtually indistinguishable from a site-built structure.
 Improved air quality. Many of the indoor air quality issues identified in new construction result from high moisture levels in the framing materials. Because the modular structure is substantially completed in a factory-controlled setting using dry materials, the potential for high levels of moisture being trapped in the new construction is eliminated.

Modular buildings can also contribute to LEED requirements in any category site-built construction can, and can even provide an advantage in the areas of Sustainable Sites, Energy and Atmosphere, Materials and Resources, and Indoor Environmental Quality.
Modular construction can also provide an advantage in similar categories in the International Green Construction Code.

Disadvantages
Volumetric: Transporting the completed modular building sections take up a lot of space.
 Flexibility: Due to transport and sometimes manufacturing restrictions, module size can be limited, affecting room sizes.
 Some financial institutions may be hesitant to offer a loan for a modular home.

Market acceptance

Some home buyers and some lending institutions resist consideration of modular homes as equivalent in value to site-built homes. While the homes themselves may be of equivalent quality, entrenched zoning regulations and psychological marketplace factors may create hurdles for buyers or builders of modular homes and should be considered as part of the decision-making process when exploring this type of home as a living and/or investment option. In the UK and Australia, modular homes have become accepted in some regional areas; however, they are not commonly built in major cities. Modular homes are becoming increasingly common in Japanese urban areas, due to improvements in design and quality, speed and compactness of onsite assembly, as well as due to lowering costs and ease of repair after earthquakes. Recent innovations allow modular buildings to be indistinguishable from site-built structures. Surveys have shown that individuals can rarely tell the difference between a modular home and a site-built home.

Modular homes vs. mobile homes
Differences include the building codes that govern the construction, types of material used and how they are appraised by banks for lending purposes. Modular homes are built to either local or state building codes as opposed to manufactured homes, which are also built in a factory but are governed by a federal building code. The codes that govern the construction of modular homes are exactly the same codes that govern the construction of site-constructed homes. In the United States, all modular homes are constructed according to the International Building Code (IBC), IRC, BOCA or the code that has been adopted by the local jurisdiction. In some states, such as California, mobile homes must still be registered yearly, like vehicles or standard trailers, with the Department of Motor Vehicles or other state agency. This is true even if the owners remove the axles and place it on a permanent foundation.

Recognizing a mobile or manufactured home
A mobile home should have a small metal tag on the outside of each section. If a tag cannot be located, details about the home can be found in the electrical panel box. This tag should also reveal a manufacturing date. Modular homes do not have metal tags on the outside but will have a dataplate installed inside the home, usually under the kitchen sink or in a closet. The dataplate will provide information such as the manufacturer, third party inspection agency, appliance information, and manufacture date.

Materials
The materials used in modular buildings are of the same quality and durability as those used in traditional construction, preserving characteristics such as acoustic insulation and energy efficiency, as well as allowing for attractive and innovative designs thanks to their versatility. Most commonly used are steel, wood and concrete.
•	Steel: Because it is easily moldable, it allows for innovation in design and aesthetics.
•	Wood: Wood is an essential part of most modular buildings. Thanks to its lightness, it facilitates the work of assembling and moving the prefabricated modules.
•	Concrete: Concrete offers a solid structure that is ideal for the structural reinforcement of permanent modular buildings. It is increasingly being used as a base material in this type of building, thanks to its various characteristics such as fire resistance, energy savings, greater acoustic insulation, and durability.

Wood-frame floors, walls and roof are often utilized. Some modular homes include brick or stone exteriors, granite counters and steeply pitched roofs. Modulars can be designed to sit on a perimeter foundation or basement. In contrast, mobile homes are constructed with a steel chassis that is integral to the integrity of the floor system. Modular buildings can be custom built to a client's specifications. Current designs include multi-story units, multi-family units and entire apartment complexes. The negative stereotype commonly associated with mobile homes has prompted some manufacturers to start using the term "off-site construction."

New modular offerings include other construction methods such as cross-laminated timber frames.

Financing 
Mobile homes often require special lenders.

Modular homes on the other hand are financed as site built homes with a construction loan

Standards and zoning considerations
Typically, modular dwellings are built to local, state or council code, resulting in dwellings from a given manufacturing facility having differing construction standards depending on the final destination of the modules. The most important zones that manufacturers have to take into consideration are local wind, heat, and snow load zones. For example, homes built for final assembly in a hurricane-prone, earthquake or flooding area may include additional bracing to meet local building codes. Steel and/or wood framing are common options for building a modular home.

Some US courts have ruled that zoning restrictions applicable to mobile homes do not apply to modular homes since modular homes are designed to have a permanent foundation. Additionally, in the US, valuation differences between modular homes and site-built homes are often negligible in real estate appraisal practice; modular homes can, in some market areas, (depending on local appraisal practices per Uniform Standards of Professional Appraisal Practice) be evaluated the same way as site-built dwellings of similar quality. In Australia, manufactured home parks are governed by additional legislation that does not apply to permanent modular homes. Possible developments in equivalence between modular and site-built housing types for the purposes of real estate appraisals, financing and zoning may increase the sales of modular homes over time.

In Wales (UK), a businessman authorized the placement of 6 mini modular homes called “Pods” for homeless persons on private property.

CLASP (Consortium of Local Authorities Special Programme)
The Consortium of Local Authorities Special Programme (abbreviated and more commonly referred to as CLASP), was formed in England in 1957 to combine the resources of Local Authorities with the purpose of developing a prefabricated school building programme. Initially developed by Charles Herbert Aslin, the county architect for Hertfordshire, the system was used as a model for several other counties, most notably Nottinghamshire and Derbyshire. CLASP's popularity in these coal mining areas was in part because the system permitted fairly straightforward replacement of subsidence-damaged sections of building.

Building strength
Modular homes are designed to be stronger than traditional homes by, for example, replacing nails with screws, adding glue to joints, and using 8–10% more lumber than conventional housing. This is to help the modules maintain their structural integrity as they are transported on trucks to the construction site. However, there are few studies on the response of modular buildings to transport and handling stresses. It is therefore presently difficult to predict transport induced damage.

When FEMA studied the destruction wrought by Hurricane Andrew in Dade County Florida, they concluded that modular and masonry homes fared best compared to other construction.

CE marking
The CE mark is a construction norm that guarantees the user of mechanical resistance and strength of the structure. It is a label given by European community empowered authorities for end-to-end process mastering and traceability.

All manufacturing operations are being monitored and recorded:
 Suppliers have to be known and certified,
 Raw materials and goods being sourced are to be recorded by batch used,
 Elementary products are recorded and their quality is monitored,
 Assembly quality is managed and assessed on a step by step basis,
 When a modular unit is finished, a whole set of tests are performed and if quality standards are met, a unique number and EC stamp is attached to and on the unit.

This ID and all the details are recorded in a database, At any time, the producer has to be able to answer and provide all the information from each step of the production of a single unit, The EC certification guaranties standards in terms of durability, resistance against wind and earthquakes.

Surfaces and finishes
Modular buildings can be assembled on top of multiple foundation surfaces, such as a crawl space, stilts (for areas that are prone to flooding), full basements or standard slab at grade. They can also be built to multi-story heights. Motels and other multi-family structures have been built using modular construction techniques. The height to which a modular structure can be built depends on jurisdiction, but a number of countries, especially in Asia, allow them to be built to 24 floors or more.

Exterior wall surfaces can be finalized in the plant production process or in the case of brick/stone veneers, field applications may be the builders' choice. Roof systems also can be applied in the field after the basic installation is completed.

U.S. regional differences with modular construction
Weather, population density, geographical distances, and local housing architecture play a role in the use of modular construction for home building. Because modular construction is so adaptable, it has begun to permeate every region of the U.S.

Northeast

The northeast is populated with factories that can combine modular housing design with other construction methods such as panelization and SIPs. Modular homes are typically treated just like traditional homes, so they have the same zoning laws as a stick-built home. This process is different than with manufactured homes, which tend to have more strict requirements in place. Regional differences exist in the use of modular, panelized, and precut construction methods. Of the U.S. Census Bureau’s four national subregions, the Northeast has the highest percentage of single-family homes constructed offsite exclusive of manufactured homes, with 7 percent of new homes being modular and 3 percent of homes built with panelized sections or precut materials in 2018. Modules are typically limited to 16' width and up to 70' lengths because of the narrow road structure and densely populated areas of the region. Other limitations are placed on transportation to locations such as Connecticut, Cape Cod, and Long Island.

Mid-Atlantic
The Mid-Atlantic region is similar to the northeast, in terms of building design and transport restriction to modules to a width of not more than 16'.

Southeast

Manufacturers in the Southeast often limit their ability to customize homes and focus on very traditional single story floor plans. Much of the south is in coastal and high wind areas; modular construction may prove appealing in this area as it is already inherently stronger as it must be built for transport and craned installation, therefore offering wind resistance as good or higher than site-built construction.

Central Plains
The central plains states typically are made up of farming and rural communities. Ranch homes are the mainstay of the region. Prone to strong storms and tornado conditions, modular construction offers the ability to better withstand these storm patterns than its site built counterpart. The inter-module attachments that must be made when assembling a modular home on a foundation offer an inherently stronger home than site built construction can offer. Interior finishes on both the walls and ceilings are typically textured. Corners on interior walls are typically rounded and finish trim around windows is optional. Because of the wider road and lower population density, modules can be as wide as 20' and as long as 90'. The ability to provide larger modules reduces the amount of modules needed to complete a home.

Rockies
Home design in this area ranges from Chalet style homes to log cabin style homes. Manufacturers in the region therefore provide a number of styles of homes. Capability varies from factory to factory as well as the ability to do complete customization of floor plans. Transportation is limited mostly to 16' wide modules to travel the roads of the area.

West Coast
The high cost of living in coastal areas, and especially California, may provide modular construction an edge due to its lower cost. Extreme building regulation and environmental requirements can delay the start of residential construction. Several factories specialize in environmentally responsible construction by following green construction standards and offering zero energy homes.

Living in coastal areas also mean that the modular home structure should be strong enough to withstand winds with high velocity. Modular homes, built correctly, have such kind of resistance to stand high wind velocity without any damage issues.

Open modular building 

The term Modularity can be perceived in different ways. It can even be extended to building P2P (peer-to-peer) applications; where a tailored use of the P2P technology is with the aid of a modular paradigm. Here, well-understood components with clean interfaces can be combined to implement arbitrarily complex functions in the hopes of further proliferating self-organising P2P technology. Open modular buildings are an excellent example of this. Modular building can also be open source and green. 
Bauwens, Kostakis and Pazaitis elaborate on this kind of modularity. They link modularity to the construction of houses.

This commons-based activity is geared towards modularity. The construction of modular buildings enables a community to share designs and tools related to all the different parts of house construction. A socially-oriented endeavour that deals with the external architecture of buildings and the internal dynamics of open source commons. People are thus provided with the tools to reconfigure the public sphere in the area where they live, especially in urban environments. There is a robust socializing element that is reminiscent of pre-industrial vernacular architecture and community-based building.

Some organisations already provide modular housing. Such organisations are relevant as they allow for the online sharing of construction plans and tools. These plans can be then assembled, through either digital fabrication like 3D printing or even sourcing low-cost materials from local communities. It has been noticed that given how easy it is to use these low-cost materials are (for example: plywood), it can help increase the permeation of these open buildings to areas or communities that lack the know-how or abilities of conventional architectural or construction firms. Ergo, it allows for a fundamentally more standardised way of constructing houses and buildings. The overarching idea behind it remains key - to allow for easy access to user-friendly layouts which anyone can use to build in a more sustainable and affordable way.

Modularity in this sense is building a house from different standardised parts, like solving a jigsaw puzzle.

3D printing can be used to build the house.

The main standard is OpenStructures and its derivative Autarkytecture.

Key markets 
Permanent modular buildings can be utilized in any application where stick-built construction is used. The primary markets served are K-12 education, higher education student housing, office and administrative space, retail and hospitality, healthcare, and publicly funded facilities.

Research and development 
Modular construction is the subject of continued research and development worldwide as the technology is applied to taller and taller buildings. Research and development is carried out by modular building companies and also research institutes such as the Modular Building Institute and the Steel Construction Institute,.

See also

 Affordable housing
 Alternative housing
Commercial modular construction
Construction 3D printing
Container home
Kit house
MAN steel house
Manufactured housing
Modular design
Portable building
Prefabrication
Open-source architecture
Open source hardware
OpenStructures
Prefabricated home
Relocatable buildings
Recreational vehicles
 Shipping container architecture
Stick-built home
Tiny house movement
Toter

References 
 34 - "Volumetric modular construction trend gaining groun d". https://www.aa.com.tr/en/corporate-news/volumetric-modular-construction-trend-gaining-ground/2357158 06.09.2021

Building engineering
Prefabricated buildings
Building
Sustainable building
Buildings and structures by type
Building
Buildings and structures